Duvle (Sikwari) is a Lakes Plain language of the Papua, Indonesia. It is spoken in Dagai village in Dagai District, Puncak Jaya Regency.

Variant spellings are Duvde, Duve, Duvele, Duvre. It is also known as Wiri.

A Duvle-based pidgin is used with speakers of Wano as well.

References

Duvle–East Lakes Plain languages